Osaka Butsuryo University (Japanese: 大阪物療大学, Ōsaka Butsuryō Daigaku) is a private university in Sakai, Osaka. It was founded in 1933 as Butsuryo Gakuin, and established as a university in 2011.

History 

 1933 - Founded as Butsuryo Gakuin (物療学院).
 1955 - Renamed Osaka Butsuryo Specialized Training College (大阪物療専門学校).
 1985 - Osaka Butsuryo Specialized Training College became a part of educational corporation Butsuryo Gakuen (学校法人物療学園).
 1988 - Moved to the Sakai building (current campus)
 2011 - Osaka Butsuryo University is established.
 2013 - Osaka Butsuryo Specialized Training College is closed.

Faculties and research

Faculties 

 Faculty of Health Sciences
 Department of Radiological Technology
 Clinical Skills Education Program

Affiliated school 

 Osaka Butsuryo Specialized Training College

External links 
 Osaka Butsuryo University

References 

Educational institutions established in 2011
Sakai, Osaka
Private universities and colleges in Japan
Universities and colleges in Osaka Prefecture
2011 establishments in Japan